Vagococcus carniphilus is a Gram-positive, non-spore-forming species of bacteria. The type strain of V. carniphilus is 1843-02T (=ATCC BAA-640T =CCUG 46823T).

References

Further reading

External links
LPSN

Type strain of Vagococcus carniphilus at BacDive -  the Bacterial Diversity Metadatabase

Lactobacillales
Bacteria described in 2004